This is about the Angolan football (soccer) competition. For the similarly named sports competitions, see Taça de Angola (basketball), Taça de Angola (handball) Taça de Angola (roller hockey)
The Angolan football Cup is the main "knockout" cup competition in Angolan football.

The competition was established in 1980, whose format, in the first two editions, consisted of teams made up of the best players in each province, the so-called (selecção provincial). Starting from the 1982 season, the competition officially adopted the current club format.

The club format was established in 1982 following an unofficial cup competition won by Nacional de Benguela in 1980 and by TAAG in 1981. It is a knockout (one or two-leg elimination) tournament.

Finals

Titles by team

Managers

Angola cup participation details

2000-2020

1982–1990

1982–1990 National stage brackets

1987

1986

1985

1984

Taça de Angola (women's)

See also
 Supertaça de Angola
 Girabola
 Women's League

External links
 Tournament profile at girabola.com
 Noticias Taça de Angola

References

Angola Cup
Angola
1
Recurring sporting events established in 1982